Dean Island may refer to:

Dean Island (Antarctica)
Dean Island (Western Australia)